Showkatabad (also romanized as Showḵatābād; also known as Shokat Abad) is a village in Aliabad Rural District, in the Central District of Anbarabad County, Kerman Province, Iran. At the 2006 census, its population was 341, in 68 families.

References 

Populated places in Anbarabad County